The 1990 Arkansas State Indians football team represented Arkansas State University as an independent during the 1990 NCAA Division I-AA football season. Led by first-year head coach Al Kincaid, the Indians finished the season with a record of 3–7–1. They were outscored by their opponents 313 to 200.

Schedule

References

Arkansas State
Arkansas State Red Wolves football seasons
Arkansas State Indians football